The Racket is a 1951 black-and-white film noir drama directed by John Cromwell with uncredited directing help from Nicholas Ray, Tay Garnett, and Mel Ferrer. The production features Robert Mitchum, Lizabeth Scott, Robert Ryan, and William Conrad. Future Perry Mason regular cast members William Talman and Ray Collins appear in key roles.

The film, a remake of the 1928 film The Racket, is indirectly based on a play by Bartlett Cormack. (Edward G. Robinson played the racketeer in the original Broadway production.)

Plot
The plot is very close to the original play and the 1928 movie. Racketeer and mobster Nick Scanlon has managed to buy several of the local government and law-enforcement officials of a large midwestern American city. However, he can't seem to touch the incorruptible police captain Tom McQuigg, who refuses all attempts at bribery. The city's prosecuting attorney, Welsh, and a state police detective, Turk, are crooked and make McQuigg's job as an honest officer nearly impossible.

McQuigg persuades sexy nightclub singer Irene Hayes to testify against Scanlon, which marks her for death. McQuigg not only wants to nail Scanlon, but also stop all the mob corruption in the city –- without getting himself or his witness killed. A bomb explodes near McQuigg's home, frightening his wife, Mary.

Honest cop Bob Johnson is helpful to McQuigg, as is reporter Dave Ames, who has a romantic interest in Irene. At the police precinct one night, Scanlon walks in alone demanding to see Irene, who is being held in protective custody, and kills Johnson in cold blood. After a car chase, Scanlon is arrested. McQuigg ignores the gangster's lawyer, ripping up his writ of habeas corpus. McQuigg has the gun that killed Johnson, which has Scanlon's fingerprints on it.

Welsh and Turk make a phone call to Scanlon's unseen mob boss for instructions. They end up telling Scanlon he must remain locked up until after the next election, angering the gangster, who threatens to tell all. Welsh and Turk then gesture toward a window and silently coax Scanlon to make a run for it.

Scanlon gets his hands on the murder weapon, but it's been emptied of bullets by McQuigg, who had foreseen everything Scanlon would try. Scanlon is shot dead by Turk, who is taken into a room with Welsh by investigators bringing subpoenas.

Irene leaves with Dave, indicating her interest in him. McQuigg goes home with his wife after a long day, aware that tomorrow will probably be just as busy.

Cast
 Robert Mitchum as Captain Thomas McQuigg
 Lizabeth Scott as Irene Hayes
 Robert Ryan as Nick Scanlon
 William Talman as Officer Bob Johnson
 Ray Collins as District Attorney Mortimer X. Welsh
 Joyce MacKenzie as Mary McQuigg
 Robert Hutton as Dave Ames
 Virginia Huston as Lucy Johnson
 William Conrad as Detective Sergeant Turk
 Walter Sande as Precinct Sgt. Jim Delaney
 Les Tremayne as Harry Craig - Crime Commission chief investigator
 Don Porter as R.G. Connolly
 Walter Baldwin as Booking Sgt. Sullivan
 Brett King as Joe Scanlon
 Richard Karlan as Breeze Enright
 Tito Vuolo as Tony, Nick's Barber
 Milburn Stone as member of Craig's team (uncredited)

Reception

New York Times critic Bosley Crowther panned the film. He wrote, "In this consummation, however, the conflict of cop and crook is conspicuously unoriginal, considering the number of times that it has been contemplated on the screen since The Racket was first produced, and the staging of it, under the direction of John Cromwell, is dismally uninspired. Furthermore, the construction of the screen play by W. R. Burnett and William Wister Haines is so badly disordered toward the finish that it is almost impossible to perceive the intricacies of the planning by which the cop lures the crook to his doom. As a consequence, the collision of Mr. Mitchum and Mr. Ryan is a pretty dull one, in this instance marked mainly by exchanges of clichés, and the rest of the cast does little to add life to the activities."

Variety magazine, on the other hand, gave the film a positive review, "This remake of Bartlett Cormack's old play has been handled to emphasize clearcut action and suspense and the casting is just right to stress the rough and ready toughness in the script ... Further masculine attention is gained through the strong work of William Talman as a rookie cop ... Development is enlivened with some solid thriller sequences, such as a rooftop fight between Mitchum and a gunman, careening autos and crashes, and gunplay between the forces of good and evil."

Writing recently, critic Dennis Schwartz was disappointed with the film, writing, "... this film didn't have enough punch to be hard-hitting, as it softened all the things about widespread city corruption and made all the characters into one-dimensional types. All it had going were the action scenes and some gloss, as the original version was a much more effective film ... The film is more reflective of the 1920s than the 1940s, unfortunately it's set in the '40s. This is a typical gangster film of that era but is dated and too murky."

References

External links
 
 
 
 

1951 films
1951 crime drama films
American black-and-white films
American crime drama films
Remakes of American films
American films based on plays
American police detective films
Film noir
Films about organized crime in the United States
Films directed by John Cromwell
Films scored by Paul Sawtell
RKO Pictures films
Sound film remakes of silent films
1950s English-language films
1950s American films